Eoparargyractis irroratalis is a moth in the family Crambidae. It was described by Harrison Gray Dyar Jr. in 1917. It is found in North America, where it has been recorded from Alabama, British Columbia, Florida, Georgia, Maryland, Montana and South Carolina.

Adults have been recorded on wing nearly year round in the southern part of the range.

References

Acentropinae
Moths described in 1917